The 2011 Newfoundland and Labrador Tankard was held February 1–5 at the Remax Centre in St. John's, Newfoundland and Labrador. The winning team of Brad Gushue represented Newfoundland and Labrador at the 2011 Tim Hortons Brier in London, Ontario.

Teams

Standings

Round robin
All times NST

Draw 1
February 2, 7:00pm

Draw 2
February 3, 1:00pm

Draw 3
February 3, 7:00pm

Draw 4
February 4, 9:00am

Draw 5
February 4, 2:00pm

Playoffs

Semifinal
February 5, 1:00 PM

Final
February 5, 7:00 PM

External links
Newfoundland and Labrador Curling Association

References

Newfoundland And Labrador Tankard, 2011
Sport in St. John's, Newfoundland and Labrador
February 2011 sports events in Canada
Curling in Newfoundland and Labrador